Fontaneto d'Agogna is a comune (municipality) in the Province of Novara in the Italian region Piedmont, located about  northeast of Turin and about  northwest of Novara. It takes its name from the Agogna stream.

Fontaneto d'Agogna borders the following municipalities: Borgomanero, Cavaglietto, Cavaglio d'Agogna, Cavallirio, Cressa, Cureggio, Ghemme, Romagnano Sesia, and Suno.

References

Cities and towns in Piedmont